Dounia Abdourahim (born 17 January 1992) is a French handball player. She plays for the club Siófok KC, and on the French national team. She represented France at the 2013 World Women's Handball Championship in Serbia.

References

External links 
 

1992 births
Living people
French female handball players
Sportspeople from Nîmes